TPC Potomac at Avenel Farm (formerly TPC Avenel) is a private golf club in the eastern  United States, located in Potomac, Maryland, a suburb northwest of Washington, D.C. It was formerly a regular stop on the PGA Tour as host of the Booz Allen Classic (originally Kemper Open). After a major renovation to both clubhouse and course, the clubhouse reopened in late 2008 while the course reopened on April 28, 2009.

Renovation
Opened  in 1986, the original TPC Avenel course was roundly criticized for poor design in its early years. It was also plagued by years of flooding and drainage problems and by various turfgrass issues which affected the greens and often produced less than satisfactory tournament conditions. As a result, many top players on the PGA Tour stayed away, and the Kemper/Booz Allen tournament became unofficially relegated to "B" event status.

In the summer of 2005, Dewberry and Davis land surveying crews were regularly seen taking measurements across the facility, sparking rumors that the long criticized course would finally be reconfigured. Confirmation came in 2007, when a $32 million golf course and clubhouse renovation commenced in an effort to bring back a tournament to the Washington D.C. area. The renovation covered the entire course, which has been reshaped into a new  course at par 70 with Rock Run Creek being expanded and cleaned up.

The controversial sixth hole (conceived as a weak copy of the 13th at Augusta National) was changed to a straightaway long par-four with the green now short and left of the creek. The par-3 ninth (famously maligned by Greg Norman, who suggested the original be "blown up with dynamite") was rebuilt with a new green up on a hill near the old practice green. The old 10th and 11th holes have been combined into the new tenth, a long par-five playing around the restored creek feature. The old 12th is now the 11th, with the old par-five 13th (another popular target of player angst) eliminated and replaced by a new, uphill par-three 12th and a short, par-four 13th.

In addition to the golf course, the project also included a new practice facility and short game area, and clubhouse renovations.

In November 2015, the 7th and 16th greens were renovated to flatten contours and provide additional hole locations in anticipation of hosting the Quicken Loans National in 2017. Additionally, small improvements were made to a number of holes, including creating bent grass chipping and collection areas around the 3rd, 4th, and 18th greens, widening the 5th and 6th fairways, and flattening the front portion of the 13th green to create additional hole locations.

The course was scheduled to host the PGA Tour's Wells Fargo Championship in 2021, as its regular site, Quail Hollow Club in Charlotte, North Carolina, was to host the Presidents Cup. Following scheduling changes due to the coronavirus pandemic, this was delayed a year to 2022.

Scorecard

Redesigned layout

Original layout

Tour events
Kemper Open from 1987 to 1999
Kemper Insurance Open from 2000 to 2002
FBR Capital Open in 2003
Booz Allen Classic in 2004 and 2006 (moved to neighboring Congressional in 2005)
Constellation Energy Senior Players Championship in 2010
Neediest Kids Championship presented by Under Armour in 2012 and the Mid-Atlantic Championship in 2013
Quicken Loans National in 2017 and 2018
Wells Fargo Championship is scheduled for May 2022

In 2006, the tournament ended on Tuesday due to persistent storms in the D.C. area. It was the first time a Tour event had been played on a Tuesday since 1968. The conclusion of the final Booz Allen Classic was not televised.

In 2007, Tiger Woods announced his new tournament, the AT&T National, was to be played at neighboring Congressional Country Club. When it was preparing to host its third U.S. Open in 2011, there was speculation that TPC Potomac could serve as a replacement venue for 2010 and 2011. However, the tournament was held in Aronimink Golf Club instead, as the club "sees how the reconfigured course played and how members responded to it before considering hosting major tournaments."

In 2010, the Constellation Energy Senior Players Championship was moved from Baltimore Country Club in Timonium to the TPC Potomac at Avenel Farm. The renovated TPC Potomac received many positive reviews from the players during the tournament.

TPC Potomac hosted Web.com Tour events in successive years; the Neediest Kids Championship in 2012 and Mid-Atlantic Championship in 2013.

In 2014, the PGA Tour announced that TPC Potomac would host the Quicken Loans National in 2017. The tournament marked the first time the PGA Tour had held an event at TPC Potomac since 2006.

On April 30, 2019, the PGA Tour announced that TPC Potomac would host the 2021 Wells Fargo Championship due to Quail Hollow Club hosting the Presidents Cup. With the postponement of the Ryder Cup from 2020 to 2021 and subsequent rescheduling of the Presidents Cup to 2022, TPC Potomac will now host the Wells Fargo in 2022.

Note: Green highlight indicates scoring records.
Source:

See also
Tournament Players Club

References

External links
 
 PGA Tour Official Site
 In-depth article on the renovations

Golf clubs and courses in Maryland
Potomac, Maryland
1986 establishments in Maryland
Buildings and structures in Montgomery County, Maryland
Sports venues completed in 1986